Kyungu may also refer to:

 Kyungu, Democratic Republic of the Congo a town in the Democratic Republic of the Congo
 Kyungu a traditional authority in Karonga District of Malawi